William Montague Browne (July 7, 1823 – April 28, 1883) was a prominent Confederate politician and American newsman. During the American Civil War, he served as Acting Secretary of State for the Confederacy in 1862 and as a temporary brigadier general in the Confederate States Army. When he was not confirmed to that rank by the Confederate Senate, he reverted to his permanent grade of colonel.

Early life
Browne was born in County Mayo in Ireland on July 7, 1823 as (apparently the fifth) son of D. Geoffrey Browne, MP. Definite information about some events, positions or locations in his early life, including an uncertain higher education, alleged service in the British Army during the Crimean War, diplomatic services and his initial whereabouts in the United States during the early 1850s, appears to be unavailable. Residing in New York City by 1855 or 56, he wrote for the New York Journal of Commerce. He associated with the Democratic Party and later became a clerk in the House of Customs. In 1859 Browne moved to Washington D.C. and wrote for the pro-administration Washington Constitution.

American Civil War

In 1861 Browne, known as Constitution Browne by then, had become a well-connected proponent of secession and moved to Athens, Georgia, after that. A favorite of both the just elected Confederate President Jefferson Davis and his Secretary of State Robert Toombs he was appointed Assistant Secretary of State. On several occasions in 1861 and 62 Browne acted as interim Secretary. Living in Richmond, Virginia with his wife, Eliza Jane Beket, he had two permanent houseguests. One was Howell Cobb, a former United States Secretary of the Treasury and an old and close friend from Washington, who now was the President of Provisional Confederate Congress. The other was his younger brother, Colonel Thomas R.R. Cobb.

Browne resigned in March 1862 and was assigned as military aide-de-camp to President Davis, with the rank of a Colonel of cavalry. Beside his main duty on the staff he also was assigned to command a battalion of local defense cavalry. On April 5, 1864 Davis appointed Browne as Commandant of Conscription in Georgia, where Governor Joseph E. Brown consistently hindered the Confederate war efforts. Browne was a natural choice as a Georgia resident who had inspected and reported about the conscription in Georgia before.

In late 1864 Browne, while still enforcing conscription, was detached to commanded a small brigade of reserves during the Savannah Campaign. In December, Browne was promoted to temporary brigadier general, to rank from November 11, 1864. He resumed his conscription duty in January 1865. In February 1865 his promotion was not confirmed by the Confederate Senate and he reverted to colonel. Despite this he later was excluded from amnesty on grounds of being both a civil officeholder and a military officer ranking higher than colonel. He was paroled on May 8, and pardoned either in late 1865 or 66.

Later life
Afterwards Browne, back in Athens, studied law and was admitted to the bar in 1866. Beside his practice of law he became a newspaper man again when he took over editorship of the Southern Banner in 1868. Despite his position, the Brownes suffered from relative poverty and fragile health.

He was the great-great-uncle of Sir Robert Ricketts, 7th Baronet of Gloucestershire England.

See also
List of American Civil War generals (Acting Confederate)

Notes

References

External links
 Short Biography at the Confederate War Department
 

1827 births
1883 deaths
19th-century American politicians
Alumni of Trinity College Dublin
19th-century Anglo-Irish people
British Army personnel of the Crimean War
Confederate States Army brigadier generals
Executive members of the Cabinet of the Confederate States of America
Irish soldiers in the British Army
Irish soldiers in the Confederate States Army
Military personnel from County Mayo
People educated at Rugby School
People of Georgia (U.S. state) in the American Civil War
Recipients of American presidential pardons
University of Georgia faculty